The Army Headquarters Building, also known as the Stone Palace and the Baumgarten's Palace, is located in Serbia, in Belgrade at 33 Kneza Miloša street. It was built in the period from 1924 to 1928 after the design of the architect, Russian immigrant, Vasily Wilhelm Baumgarten. This monumental and decorative building represents one of the best examples of public buildings erected in Belgrade in the period between two World Wars in the style of academism. After the Second World War in the time of the Socialist Federal Republic of Yugoslavia, it was the used as the headquarters of the Yugoslav People's Army. Since 1984 the building has been under the protection of the country and has the status of cultural monument.

History 
The period between two wars in Belgrade was marked by the erection of a large number of private and public buildings. In this period, the buildings were designed according to the academic concept, as monumental buildings with the symmetrical scheme of the basis, with tall columns and pilasters and other elements which represent the reminiscence to the historical styles, first of all classicism. In the late 19th century Europe the architecture of historical styles, which prevailed in the European architecture, underwent its transformation reflecting in the looser application of these styles. In Europe and in our country, the state institutions and rich investors played the important role in promotion of the architecture of historical styles. The monumental and decorative architecture were used to emphasize the power and the social position so the state and public buildings were built in this style, which became official. Technical High Schools and the Academies in the European centres contributed to the conformation and accreditation of the academic architecture based on the eclecticism as the style accepted by the state. Certain types of public buildings followed the established scheme and only individuals managed to achieve progress in creative and any other sense. Right in the period between the two wars, Belgrade begins to spread intensively. Monumental architectural masterpieces represented the confirmation and some kind of materialization of the new social reality created after the announcement of the Kingdom. After the First World War in Belgrade, the concentration of state administration made it political and administrative centre of the entire Kingdom of Serbs, Croats and Slovenes.  One after the other, the buildings of the state ministries were built in the Kneza Miloša Street and each subsequent building was bigger and more expensive than the previous one.

When built, it was one of the most modern buildings in Europe compared to similar buildings intended for the Army Headquarters. In 1937 The Stone Palace was declared the most beautiful building in Belgrade. Nowadays, this palace represents an important cultural and historical monument. It spreads on 9.543 m² of useful area. One of the most representative halls in Serbia is in the building. It is the famous Grand War Hall, located on the mezzanine of the palace, in the room 49. Important state decisions were made in that hall, ceremonious army balls were organized, and the Government sessions were held. The interior of the Grand Hall represents an authentic masterpiece, with magnificent columns, above which there was a gallery with arch openings, where sometimes, if it was necessary, a choir was standing.
The Stone Palace, that is, the Army Headquarters Building of Yugoslav Royal Army was one of the few buildings that Germans did not hit during the April bombing of Belgrade in 1941, although one of the first bombs fell only few metres from it, on the former building of the Ministry of War.

Architect 
When it was erected, the Former Army Headquarters Building was one of the most monumental and most expensive buildings. The architect, Vasily Baumgarten, realized many other important works, especially in the period between the mid-twenties and mid-thirties. Along with the Army Headquarters Building, which remains his central work, he also designed the Russian House in Queen Natalija Street, the palace of the Officers' Club in Skoplje (destroyed in the 1963 earthquake), and the building of the Officers' Club in Bitolj.

About the building

Facades 
The facades were firmly composed and emphasized by the rhythmical row of columns with Corinthian capitols, doubled on the cornered projections. These columns take up three-storey height and bear a massive architrave flowing along all the facades and significantly stick out from the plane. Decorative structures in full plastic representing warriors and scenes from the warrior life are set up on the cornered projections above the architraved cornice. As a rule, the groups are two-membered and they represent: the fight of warriors, the warrior and the wounded, who kills the woman and himself, and the archer and the warrior with a sword. Each group repeats three times, so the compositions of four groups set up over the cornered projections are visible on all three corners of the facade. The author of these sculptures is the architect Ivan Rik. Being familiar with the Antique Sculpture of the classical period, Rik made the sketches in which the themes, the movement, the clothes and the weapons were precisely presented. These sculptures can be classified as the better designs of the decorative plastic on the facades of the buildings in Belgrade. The workshop of the Ivana Vanik and Milan Duhač  worked on the processing of these facades, richly ornamented with architectural elements.

Interior 
The interior of the Army Headquarters building is richly and carefully decorated. The walls, the floors and the ceilings were done in different materials and decorative elements mostly originating from the period of Antique and renaissance. It could be said that, by style, the interior is the closest to the Russian empire style, the prevailing style in the artistic circles in the first half of the 19th century. Although the building of the former Army Headquarters was designed a hundred years later, these influences were more than obvious. The assumption is that the author was inspired by some palace or public building from the Imperial Russia, the country of his origin. The entrance, the vestibule and the ceremonial hall were the most richly decorated. The central staircase at the entrance is flanked with the parapets, and two doubled columns rise up from there, bearing the coffered ceiling. The coffered ceiling is filled with floral rosettes. The ceiling in the longitudinal hall is decorated with the stucco and painted decorations with the motifs taken from the renaissance decorative program, the ceiling above the ceremonial bifurcated staircase is decorated with the medallions and ornaments of the floral origin. The central decorative motif of the entrance part is the monumental composition at the entrance door of the ceremonial hall. This entrance was decorated with double columns in articulated roughly hewn stone with the tympanum and the sculptural composition in the high relief, and which represents Samson and a lion. The composition Samson and a lion was done by Vladimir Zagorodnjuk, the author of decorative sculptures on many other buildings in Belgrade. The composition Samson and a lion personifies the power and the fight. It is thematically appropriate in that space. Formally, it was taken from the garden architecture of the late renaissance villas and in the interior it was inappropriately used.

The Warriors' Hall 
The ceremonial hall – the Warriors' hall has side-mounted windows, with rhythmically arranged columns between them, with Corinthian capitols bearing the architraved cornice. Above the cornice there are warriors' busts, naked and in armour. The ceiling is decorated with medallions with floral elements, similar to the ceiling in vestibule. Above the entrance door the cartouche with military insignations bearing two female figures was set up. The overall internal decoration of the building was done by the workshop of Spasa Petrović. A very rich decoration and the use of luxurious materials testify about the great attention dedicated to the decoration of the "Warriors' Hall " which belongs to the most beautifully decorated halls in Belgrade of that time. After the Second World War the inadequate repainting of the stucco and painting decoration was undertaken. These works contributed to even more invasive appearance of the decorative interior. The Cultural Heritage Protection Institute of the City of Belgrade finished the project for the reconstruction of the facades, the project for the conservatory and restoration works in the interior of the Warriors' Hall, as well as the conservatory supervision during these works in 2009 and 2010.

Importance 
Due to all its historical and architectural values, the Army headquarters building was declared a cultural property.

See more 
 List of Yugoslav World War II monuments and memorials in Serbia

References

External links 
 Републички завод за заштиту споменика културе – Београд
 Листа споменика
 Републички завод за заштиту споменика културе-Београд/База непокретних културних добара

Protected Monuments of Culture
Buildings and structures in Belgrade
Royal Yugoslav Army
Headquarters in Serbia
National army headquarters
Defunct organizations based in Serbia
Closed military installations
Savski Venac